The following lists events that happened during 1941 in Cape Verde.

Incumbents
Colonial governor:
Amadeu Gomes de Figueiredo
José Diogo Ferreira Martins

Events
Famine in Cape Verde

References

 
1941 in the Portuguese Empire
Years of the 20th century in Cape Verde
1940s in Cape Verde
Cape Verde
Cape Verde